Noeta may refer to:

Noeta, a Greek term used in philosophy and the focus of studies of nous, noetics, and their application to noumena in phenomenology
Noeeta or Noeta, a genus of fruit fly